The 1868 Michigan gubernatorial election was held on November 3, 1868. Republican nominee Henry P. Baldwin defeated Democratic nominee John Moore with 56.65% of the vote.

General election

Candidates
Major party candidates
Henry P. Baldwin, Republican
John Moore, Democratic

Results

References

1868
Michigan
Gubernatorial
November 1868 events